Megan Barnard is a sports presenter for Fox Sports News Australia.

She was previously a sports presenter for Sky News Australia.

Barnard studied at the Queensland University of Technology in Brisbane, completing a Bachelor of Mass Communication, majoring in journalism, before joining NBN Television on the Gold Coast as a sports reporter.

She joined Australia's subscription news channel Sky News Australia in 2007.

Barnard hosts NRL Tonight on Fox Sports News on Monday, Tuesday and Wednesday nights as well as appearing on Fox League's Thursday Night Football presenting NRL news.

In 2020, Barnard was part of Seven Sport hosting the Women's Big Bash League coverage as part of the collaboration between Fox Cricket and the Seven Network due to the COVID-19 pandemic limiting the availability of presenters.

Barnard publicly came out as a lesbian in May 2022, saying “I knew I was gay since age 12.”

References

External links 
 Megan Barnard at Sky News Australia

Australian women television presenters
Australian LGBT broadcasters
1984 births
Living people
Queensland University of Technology alumni
Fox Sports (Australian TV network) people
Lesbian journalists
Australian lesbians
Australian LGBT journalists